Glöckner, Glockner is a German surname, which means 'bell-ringer'. Notable people with the surname include:

Andreas Glockner (born 1988), German footballer
Taylor Glockner
Angelika Glöckner (born 1962), German politician
Gottfried Glöckner
Hermann Glöckner (1889–1987), German painter and sculptor
Manfred Glöckner (1936–2005), East German slalom canoeist
Michael Glöckner (born 1969), German cyclist
Patrick Glöckner
Rudi Glöckner (1929–1999), German football referee

See also
Helga Glöckner-Neubert
Gloeckner

German-language surnames
Occupational surnames